The Eliteliga Vorarlberg is a third-tier division of Austrian football introduced in the 2019–20 season as one of the successor of the Austrian Regionalliga West. It covers the Austrian state of  Vorarlberg and is one of five leagues at this level.

2019–20 reformation
Due to high travel costs, the Vorarlberg and Tyrol clubs decide to leave the Austrian Regionalliga West and form their own Elite ligas, forcing Salzburg to do so as well. The Eliteliga were divided in a Regionalliga Salzburg, Regionalliga Tirol and Eliteliga Vorarlberg in the fall with 10 clubs each. The two best teams of these three regional leagues play in an Eliteliga play-off for promotion to the 2nd league.

Due to the COVID-19 pandemic, the 2020-21 season was halted in October 2020 with VfB Hohenems leading the pack before FC Lauterach. It was planned to resume in March 2021.

2022–23 member clubs 

SC Admira Dornbirn
SC Austria Lustenau Amateure
Dornbirner SV
FC Egg
VfB Hohenems
FC Lauterach
FC Rot-Weiss Rankweil
FC Rotenberg
SC Röthis
FC Schwarz-Weiss Bregenz
FC Wolfurt

References

External links
 Eliteliga Vorarlberg at ÖFB
 Eliteliga Vorarlberg at Ligaportal.at

West